Michał Sławomir Helik (born 9 September 1995) is a Polish professional footballer who plays as a centre-back for Huddersfield Town and the Poland national team. He has previously played for Ruch Chorzów and Barnsley.

Club career
Born in Chorzów, Helik started his career at Ruch Chorzów where he made 46 Ekstraklasa appearances and scored one goal. On 9 June 2017, it was announced that Helik would join fellow Ekstraklasa side Cracovia on a contract valid from 1 July. Over three seasons at Cracovia, he appeared in 88 league matches and scored nine goals.

On 9 September 2020, Helik joined Championship club Barnsley on a three-year deal for an undisclosed fee. He scored his first goal for Barnsley in a 2–2 draw with Bristol City on 17 October 2020.

On 1 September 2022, Helik signed for Championship side Huddersfield Town for an undisclosed fee on a three-year deal, with an optional fourth year.

International career
Helik debuted for the Poland national team in a 3–3 2022 FIFA World Cup qualification tie with Hungary on 25 March 2021.

Career statistics

Club

International

Honours
Cracovia
Polish Cup: 2019–20

Individual
 Barnsley Player of the Season: 2020–21

External links

References

1995 births
Living people
Sportspeople from Chorzów
Polish footballers
Poland international footballers
Association football defenders
Ruch Chorzów players
MKS Cracovia (football) players
Barnsley F.C. players
Huddersfield Town A.F.C. players
Ekstraklasa players
English Football League players
UEFA Euro 2020 players
Polish expatriate footballers
Polish expatriate sportspeople in England
Expatriate footballers in England